Io non spezzo... rompo is a 1971 Italian comedy film directed by Bruno Corbucci. It was shown as part of a retrospective on Italian comedy at the 67th Venice International Film Festival.

Cast
 Alighiero Noschese - Riccardo Viganò
 Enrico Montesano - Attilio Canepari
 Janet Agren - Carla Viganò
 Claudio Gora - Frank Mannata
 Lino Banfi - Zagaria - policeman from Apulia
 Gino Pernice - Policeman from Liguria
 Anna Campori - Elena - wife of Riccardo
 Giacomo Furia - Policeman from Naples
 Gordon Mitchell - Joe il Rosso
 Ignazio Leone - Mazzetti
 Mario Donatone - Tony Cupiello

References

External links

1971 films
1971 comedy films
Italian comedy films
1970s Italian-language films
Films directed by Bruno Corbucci
Films produced by Dino De Laurentiis
1970s Italian films